The UK Profile of MHEG-5 is a technical specification describing how the MHEG-5 language is used to provide interactive television services.  It was developed to provide interactive services for the UK digital terrestrial television platform by a group of broadcasters including the BBC and ONdigital.  The specification has undergone a number of revisions.  Version 1.06 was published on 15 May 2003 but has since been amended with corrigenda.

External links
 MHEG-5 UK Profile, version 1.06 download, Digital TV Group

Interactive television
Digital television in the United Kingdom